Buffalo Gap High School (BGHS) is a public school located in Swoope, Virginia. The Buffalo Gap class of 2007 scored higher in all SAT categories than every public school in Augusta County and inlying cities. The school draws its name from the nearby Buffalo Gap.

Before the 2014-2015 school year, Dr. Ian Marshall replaced William Deardorff as the principal of BGHS. Deardorff had been the principal for over 20 years.

Athletics 
Despite winning district championships in every major high school sport, Buffalo Gap's primary source of local and state-wide commendation has been for its running programs. The girls' track team has won the 2004, 2005, 2006, and 2007 Single A Virginia High School League State Championship Track Meet. The boys' cross country team has placed second in the VHSL State Championship Race (2000) and has won the State Cross Country Meet twice.

The girls' basketball team won the state championship in 1984 and were runners-up in 1983. In 2007, the varsity football team completed a perfect 14-0 season, winning the school's first state championship in football.

In March 2008 and 2009, the Varsity Girls' Basketball team won back-to-back Group A Division 1 State Championships.

Notable alumni 

 Donald DePoy, born August 10, 1949, fifth-generation bluegrass musician, music educator, and music event organizer.
 Tony Schiavone, former National Wrestling Alliance, World Championship Wrestling, World Wrestling Federation, and current All Elite Wrestling commentator, host, and producer as well as the leader of Slapdick Nation.

References

External links 
 Buffalo Gap High School

Public high schools in Virginia
Schools in Augusta County, Virginia